Mundos opuestos is a Mexican telenovela produced by Ernesto Alonso for Televisa in 1976.

Cast 
Ernesto Alonso as Claudio de la Mora
 as Luis
Lucía Méndez as Cecilia
Rita Macedo as Cristina
Carmen Montejo as Antonia
Félix González as Larios
Arsenio Campos as Alvaro
Carlos Rotzinguer as García
Rosa Gloria Chagoyan as Elba
José Alonso as José Alberto de la Mora
Ana Martín as Mónica de la Mora
Anita Blanch as Doña Josefina
Miguel Palmer as Mario de la Mora

References

External links 

Mundos opuestos was aired in 1976, it is about a girl who is raped in her house while a party was taking place in the patio.
It was a good soap-opera back in those years I wonder if we could have access to those episodes somehow.

Mexican telenovelas
1976 telenovelas
Televisa telenovelas
Spanish-language telenovelas
1976 Mexican television series debuts
1976 Mexican television series endings